Euromonitor International Ltd is a London-based market research company founded in 1972.

History
The firm was founded by Robert Senior in 1972. Trevor Fenwick joined in 1978.

Euromonitor International's main product is Passport, a subscription-based database of market research. Much of the information on Passport is written by Euromonitor International's analysts, although it also includes information from various other sources.

In 2014, the Queen's Award for Enterprise: International Trade (Export) was awarded to Euromonitor.

See also 

 Mintel
 Datamonitor

References

External links
 Official website
 This article began as a (s)lightly enhanced version of a Vietnamese-language machine translation, with English-language sourcing, including NYTimes and BBC.

Market research companies of the United Kingdom